Shanthi Priya is an Indian actress who has worked predominantly in Telugu, Tamil and Hindi films. She is credited as Nishanthi in Tamil films and Shanthipriya in Telugu and Hindi films. She is the younger sister of actress Bhanupriya.

Early life
Shanthipriya was born in Rangampeta village near Rajahmundry, Andhra Pradesh in a Telugu-speaking family, to Pandu Babu and Ragamali. Her family later moved to Chennai, Tamil Nadu. She has an elder brother Gopikrishana and an elder sister Bhanupriya, who has also been a film actress since the 1980s.

Career
Shanthi Priya acted in several films, including Enga Ooru Pattukaran (1988). She was also seen in the TV sci-fi epic Aryamaan – Brahmaand Ka Yodha opposite Mukesh Khanna in 2002.  Shanthipriya  made her debut with the Akshay Kumar-starrer Saugandh. She has acted with Mithun Chakraborty in movies such as Mere Sajana Saath Nibhana, Phool Aur Angaar and Meherbaan. She has acted in Hamilton Palace along with Mahakshay Chakraborty, son of Mithun. Shanthi Priya to make comeback in 2022 with Sarojini Naidu biopic.She is the brand ambassador for Solitario Diamonds.She is also currently acting in the MX Player series Dharavi Bank.

Personal Life
Shanthi Priya married actor Siddharth Ray in 1992. Siddharth was the grandson of V. Shantaram and has acted in films such as Baazigar and Vansh. They became the parents of two sons. Ray died of a heart attack in 2004, at the age of 40.

Filmography

Television

References

External links
 
 

Year of birth missing (living people)
Living people
Indian film actresses
Indian television actresses
20th-century Indian actresses
21st-century Indian actresses
Actresses in Hindi cinema
Actresses in Hindi television
Actresses in Kannada cinema
Actresses in Tamil cinema
Actresses in Telugu cinema
Actresses from Andhra Pradesh
People from East Godavari district